Petr Sgall (27 May 1926 – 28 May 2019) was a Czech linguist. He specialized in dependency grammar, topic–focus articulation and Common Czech.

Biography 
Sgall was born on 27 May 1926 in České Budějovice. His father was an attorney and a translator from Litomyšl of Jewish descent. Sgall studied at Česká Třebová high school; however he was expelled in the 1942/43 academic year because of his Jewish father. Most of Sgall's closest relatives were killed in the Auschwitz concentration camp.

He studied Indo-European studies, comparative linguistics, general linguistics and Czech at Charles University in Prague.

External links 
 Charles University home page
 Barbara Partee's recollections about Petr Sgall

Linguists from the Czech Republic
Academic staff of Charles University
Charles University alumni
Writers from České Budějovice
1926 births
2019 deaths
Czech Jews